Jack Kahl (September 20, 1940 – December 30, 2018) was an American businessman.

Education
Kahl was a graduate of St. Edward High School (Ohio) and John Carroll University.

Business career
Kahl was responsible for marketing duct tape as duck tape.  Kahl was founder and chief executive of Manco.

References

Businesspeople from Cleveland
St. Edward High School (Lakewood, Ohio) alumni
American business executives
John Carroll University alumni
1940 births
2018 deaths
20th-century American businesspeople